{{Infobox military conflict
| conflict    = Costa Rican Civil War
| partof      = the Cold War
| image       = File:Monumento a los caidos en la Guerra de 1048.jpg
| caption     = Monument in memory of those who died in the Civil War of 1948, located in Ernesto Zumbado park in Santa María de Dota.
| place       = Costa Rica
| date        = 12 March – 24 April 1948()
| result      = Rebel victory
 Teodoro Picado toppled
 Installation of a provisional government led by José Figueres Ferrer
 Costa Rican military abolished
 Constitutional assembly is elected
 A new Constitution is created and enacted
 Provisional government transfers power to Otilio Ulate
| combatant1  =  National Liberation Army
 Ulatista Forces
Caribbean LegionSupported by:| combatant2  =  Costa Rican government Calderon forces People's Vanguard Party Nicaraguan National Guard
| commander1  =  José Figueres Ferrer Frank Marshall Jiménez Otilio Ulate Blanco
| commander2  =  Teodoro Picado Michalski Rafael Calderón Manuel Mora Anastasio Somoza
| strength1   = 
| strength2   = 
| casualties1 = 
| casualties2 = 
| casualties3 = approx. 2,000 killed|
}}

The Costa Rican civil war' was a civil war in Costa Rica from 12 March to 24 April 1948 (44 days). The conflict began after the Legislative Assembly of Costa Rica, dominated by pro-government representatives, voted on 1 March 1948 to annul the results of the presidential elections of 8 February, alleging that the triumph of opposition candidate Otilio Ulate over the ruling party's Rafael Ángel Calderón Guardia had been achieved by fraud. This triggered an armed uprising led by José Figueres Ferrer, a businessman who had not participated in the elections, against the government of President Teodoro Picado.

The official Costa Rican army was small and ill equipped, and most of the resistance against the insurgents came from the militias of the Communist People's Vanguard Party, which was part of the governing coalition in the Legislative Assembly and had voted to annul the presidential elections.  The rebels commanded by Figueres rapidly defeated the government forces and their Communist allies, forcing President Picado to step down and leave the country along with former president Calderón Guardia.

After the war, Figueres toppled the army and ruled the country for 18 months as head of a provisional government junta, which oversaw the election of a Constitutional Assembly in December. That Assembly adopted the new 1949 constitution, after which the junta was dissolved and power was handed over to Otilio Ulate as the new constitutional president. During the war, approximately 2,000 people are believed to have died, making it the bloodiest event in 20th-century Costa Rican history. Costa Rica has not experienced any significant political violence since the end of the conflict (not counting riots).

Background
In the 1940s, the Costa Rican political scene came to be dominated by Rafael Ángel Calderón, a medical doctor who served as President of Costa Rica from 1940 to 1944. The Constitution forbade consecutive reelection, so Calderón's National Republican Party had fielded as its candidate for the 1944 elections law professor Teodoro Picado, who was perceived as a weak figure controlled by Calderón.

The Picado administration resorted several times to the use of military force in order to keep the peace, and pro-Calderón elements within the military institution would often become involved in street violence, which helped to sully the image of the military in the minds of the people.  The Costa Rican communist movement, organized in the Popular Vanguard Party led by congressman Manuel Mora, was allied to Picado's government and contributed to the unrest by deploying its militia against the opposition.  As the violence grew, supporters of the opposition began to carry guns, and the police began to threaten the use of firearms rather than just beating demonstrators.

Disgust with the government's violent reprisals against the opposition led to the Huelga de Brazos Caídos,'' a strike that stalled commerce in Costa Rica for seven days. Pro-Calderón and communist demonstrators began to sack those businesses that participated in the strike, and Picado was forced to respond to the strike with force by intimidating merchants and professionals and threatening workers with dismissal and military service. By the end of the strike, police and military forces patrolled the streets, and San José appeared as if under a state of siege.

Calderón himself was the ruling party's candidate for the election of 1948 and there were widespread fears that the government would intervene to ensure his triumph against his main opponent, journalist Otilio Ulate.  To assuage these fears, Picado's government for the first time in Costa Rican history placed the election under the control of an independent electoral tribunal.

Figueres and the Caribbean Legion

José Figueres, a Costa Rican businessman, had been forced into exile in Mexico on April 12, 1942 as a consequence of a radio broadcast in which he strongly criticized the Calderón regime.  Figueres returned to Costa Rica after the election of Picado.  Before the elections of 1948, Figueres had already been planning for a war. Unlike Ulate, former president León Cortés, and the other members of the Costa Rican opposition, Figueres felt that Calderón would never allow a fair election to take place.

Figueres began training the Caribbean Legion, an irregular force of 700.  Hoping to use Costa Rica as a base, the Legion planned to move against other authoritarian governments in Middle America. Washington, D.C. officials followed the Legion's activities with concern, especially after Figueres carried out a series of terrorist attacks inside Costa Rica during 1945 and 1946 that was supposed to climax in a general strike. The people did not respond.

1948 Elections and violent aftermath
After a highly contentious electoral process plagued by violence and irregularities concluded on February 8, 1948, the independent electoral tribunal, by a split vote of 2 to 1, declared that opposition candidate Otilio Ulate of the National Union Party, had been elected president.  The National Republican Party candidate, former president Calderón, claimed that this result had been obtained by fraud and petitioned Congress, where the coalition of his own party and the Popular Vanguard Party held a majority, to void the results and call for a new election.  When Congress granted this request the country erupted in chaos, as both sides accused the other of vote tampering and electoral fraud.

On the day that the government annulled the elections, police surrounded the home of Dr. Carlos Luis Valverde, the acting campaign manager for Union National, where Ulate was and Figueres had been only moments before. Shots rang out, and Valverde fell dead on his doorstep. Ulate escaped but was later captured and imprisoned, all of which helped to paint an especially distasteful image of the military.

Beginning of Civil War
The annulment of the election results in 1948 and the killing of Dr. Valverde on the same day seemed to give Figueres the evidence that he needed that the government had no intention of peacefully accepting the popular will, thus justifying a violent insurrection.  On March 11, Figueres made the call that brought in the arms and military leaders Figueres needed for a successful military campaign. On March 12, his National Liberation Army exchanged fire with government forces, and the war began.

Ideological context
Costa Rican politics have traditionally been guided by personal allegiances far more than by ideological consistency, and the Civil War of 1948 provides a striking example of this.  Calderón had been elected president in 1940 as the candidate of the right, closely allied with the Roman Catholic Church and with the business elite, but his enthusiastic support for the Allies during World War II and especially his punitive measures against the rich and influential German community in Costa Rica, caused that elite to withdraw its support for him.

Calderón then created a different political base by allying himself with the Costa Rican communists (the Popular Vanguard Party), led by Manuel Mora, and with the socially progressive Catholic Archbishop of San José, Víctor Manuel Sanabria, in order to pass legislation guaranteeing labor rights and establishing a welfare state.  Mora's communist militias provided important armed support for the government, both during the tense years of Picado's administration (1944–48) and during the Civil War itself.

The rebel forces led by Figueres were a disparate mix of anti-communist right-wingers, economically conservative elements weary of the welfare state (represented by the winner of the 1948 election himself, Otilio Ulate), and a social democratic intelligentsia which sought to strengthen the new welfare state while ensuring democratic transparency.  After their victory this alliance quickly fell apart.  The right-wing faction, led by the junta's Minister of Public Safety, Édgar Cardona, attempted to overthrow Figueres and was excluded from the government thereafter.  Figueres himself became closely identified with the social democratic faction, which later dominated his own National Liberation Party (PLN).  The economically conservative groups under Ulate ended up allying themselves in the 1950s with Calderón's supporters to form a broad anti-PLN coalition.

This lack of ideological consistency is further underscored by the fact that during the Civil War the government forces, despite being allied to the Costa Rican communists, enjoyed the support of right-wing Nicaraguan dictator Anastasio Somoza, while Figueres's rebels, who as anti-communists were tacitly supported by the United States, received significant aid from leftist Guatemalan president Juan José Arévalo.

Fall of Cartago
The National Liberation Army, as the rebel army called itself, slowly worked their way up the Pan American Highway, capturing small but important cities and ports with relative ease.  The official army, which was then led by Picado's brother, was unable to organize an effective resistance to Figueres' National Liberation Army.  Figueres also contended against the communist militias commanded by congressman Carlos Luis Fallas and against Nicaraguan soldiers who had been sent by Somoza to help the government retain power.

In Cartago, Costa Rica's second-largest city, located only twelve miles from the capital, Figueres' forces met considerable military opposition; however, the limited forces and supplies of the governmental forces quickly ran out, and Cartago fell into the hands of Figueres on April 12. Costa Rican President Picado, realizing that defeat was inevitable, sent notice to Figueres that he was willing to come to a compromise.

Picado's long-time political ally, Manuel Mora of the communist Popular Vanguard Party, had no intention of negotiating with Figueres. Mora's forces had sealed themselves up inside the capital of San José, and were determined not to capitulate as quickly as Picado. As the target of many of Figueres' criticisms about Costa Rica, Mora and his party were worried that a Figueres-led takeover might well lead to their expulsion from politics.

Surrender of Picado
The day after the fall of Cartago, Picado—low on supplies and without any other source of support—sent a letter to Mora and National Republican leader, and former President Calderón stating that "the attempt to hold San José would be futile and catastrophic." Mora, facing the reality that now the United States was ready to act against him as well, gave in to Picado's plea.

On April 19, Picado and Father Benjamín Núñez, an eminent labor leader within Costa Rica, signed the so-called Pact of the Mexican Embassy, ending the armed uprising. Picado resigned the next day, leaving Santos León Herrera as interim president.  Picado and former president Calderón Guardia went into exile in Nicaragua.  On 24 April, Figueres' forces entered San José, almost six weeks after beginning their revolt in southern Costa Rica.  On 8 May the provisional junta presided by Figueres formally took over the government.

References

Citations

Sources

External links 
 Costa Rica and the 1948 Revolution

 
History of Costa Rica
Military history of Costa Rica
Civil wars involving the states and peoples of North America
Civil wars post-1945
Revolution-based civil wars
Conflicts in 1948
1948 in Costa Rica
Wars involving Costa Rica